Madeline Mae Poppe (born December 5, 1997) is an American singer-songwriter, musician, and the season 16 winner of American Idol. She is a multi-instrumentalist—playing the guitar, piano, and ukulele. Prior to winning American Idol, Poppe released an independent album titled Songs from the Basement. Poppe released her first studio album, Whirlwind, with Hollywood Records in 2019.

Early life
Maddie Poppe was born to Trent and Tonya Poppe in Clarksville, Iowa. As a young girl, Poppe loved to sing for her family, but did not start performing until she was in middle school. She graduated Clarksville High School in 2016, attended Iowa Central Community College and then went to Hawkeye Community College. Her father is also a musician and is a guitarist. She used to perform with her father and his band at the Pioneer Days festival. She got her start performing at the Butler County Fairgrounds in Allison, Iowa. Poppe had also been a stagehand, setting up equipment for musicians at the county fair. 

Poppe has talked about not wanting to settle for things she did not like to do. She remarked, "I was trying to get gigs while I was supposed to be paying attention to a lecture." More than fame, Poppe has a career longevity and the enjoyment of being in music and performing.

Career

2015–2016: Songs from the Basement and The Voice 
Poppe independently released her first album, Songs from the Basement, on June 20, 2016. That same month, Poppe opened for Diamond Rio at the Butler County Fair.

Prior to Idol, she auditioned to The Voice in 2016. The program aired on NBC on February 29, 2016 in season 10 of the show. She sang "Dog Days Are Over" from Florence and the Machine, but none of the judges (who were Adam Levine, Pharrell Williams, Christina Aguilera, and Blake Shelton) turned their chairs, thus being eliminated. Despite her elimination, Clarksville honored her with a city event at the Clarksville Library.

2017–2018: American Idol 

In an audition held in New York, Poppe sang "Rainbow Connection" from The Muppet Movie. Judge Lionel Richie said she had a "storytelling voice" and that "we need you in this show". Katy Perry said she had a "distinctive quality in your voice" and Luke Bryan said "I'm not critiquing you, 'cause you got me, I'm saying yes." After singing her original song "Don't Ever Let Your Children Grow Up," Perry said Poppe reminded her of herself as they "write a little bit of the same style."
 
Before her Top 24 performance, Poppe admitted that she didn't expect to win American Idol, planning to make it to Top 24 and get eliminated at some point. "This sounds terrible, but I don't want to go into things with super high hopes because then, obviously, I would be super let down if it doesn't work out," she told Bobby Bones. Poppe also admitted she has stage fright. "I remember times when I'd gotten up on stage and it totally just flopped. I fear that every time I walk on stage, I worry that it's going to happen again."

In her Top 14, Poppe sang "Homeward Bound" by Simon & Garfunkel, sparking Katy Perry to remark, "I closed my eyes and I thought I was listening to Joni Mitchell," while Luke Bryan labeled the interweaving of her modal voice and falsetto as "seasoned" and "big-time pro." 

Prior to the May 20 finale, Iowa Governor Kim Reynolds declared May 20, 2018 to be "Maddie Poppe Day". During the finale, she performed her winners' single "Going Going Gone", which was originally written by Mitch Allan, Lindy Robbins and Julia Michaels. At the end of the show, after Poppe performed "Landslide" by Fleetwood Mac, Katy Perry revealed she would be voting for her. 

On the results show broadcast on May 21, Poppe was declared the winner, with Caleb Lee Hutchinson as runner-up and Gabby Barrett in third. Prior to the results being revealed, Hutchinson announced that he and Poppe were dating. Poppe was also the first female winner since Candice Glover in season twelve and the first Caucasian female winner since Carrie Underwood in season four.

2019–present: Whirlwind and Christmas From Home 
On May 17, 2019, Poppe released her first studio album, Whirlwind. She appeared on American Idol on April 21 to advertise her new album; however, the show cut to commercial before she was able to mention it. She also appeared on the finale episode of season 17. Whirlwind's third single "Made You Miss" debuted at number 39 on the US Adult Top 40 chart, later peaking at number 21. In total, the single spent 16 weeks on the chart. Whirlwind's fourth single "Not Losing You" debuted at number 37 on the US Adult Top 40 on October 12 and peaked at number 26, spending 17 weeks on the chart. 

Poppe joined Ingrid Michaelson on the Dramatic Tour in the United States from October 3 to 29, 2019. On November 20, 2020, Poppe independently released her holiday EP, Christmas From Home. She went on the Maddie Poppe's Acoustic Christmas tour in Iowa from December 4 to 19, 2020.

Poppe would depart from her "folk/Americana" roots with her single "One That Got Away", which released on April 29, 2022. The music video, which released on May 24, 2022, featured Poppe as an escaped convict and Hutchinson as a detective. Poppe would release "Peace of Mind", a drum- and guitar-backed ballad, on August 12, 2022. Poppe was a surprise celebrity guest on The Masked Singer Tour, in Omaha, Nebraska, on May 28, 2022.

Discography

Studio albums

Extended plays

Singles

Promotional singles

Awards and nominations

See also
List of Idols winners

References

External links
Official website
 Maddie Poppe on American Idol
 

1997 births
Living people
American Idol winners
American Idol participants
The Voice (franchise) contestants
People from Butler County, Iowa
Singers from Iowa
21st-century American singers
Hollywood Records artists
19 Recordings artists
21st-century American women singers